Justin Hong-Kee Min (born March 20, 1990) is an American actor. He began his acting career with roles in several Wong Fu productions. He plays Ben Hargreeves in the Netflix original series The Umbrella Academy (2019–present). He is also known for playing the titular role in After Yang (2021).

Early life and education 
Min is a second-generation Korean American from Cerritos, California. He is fluent in Korean, and is a second cousin of Ashley Park.

He graduated from Cerritos High School in 2007. He then attended Cornell University, where he served on the Student Assembly as the Minority Liaison; he graduated from the school's College of Arts & Sciences in 2011 with degrees in Government and English.

Career 
Prior to acting, Min was a journalist and photographer for various magazines. He completed photography assignments for the J.A.M. Awards, inVISIBLE, and The Served.

Min began acting in 2012. His early roles include appearances on TV series Faking It, CSI: Cyber, and Pure Genius. He is a collaborator of Wong Fu Productions, an independent production company based in Los Angeles, having starred in their 2017 short film How I Became an Adult and their 2019 web series Dating After College, among other projects.

In 2019, Min began starring in the Netflix series The Umbrella Academy as Ben Hargreeves. He was promoted to the main cast, from recurring character, in season 2. As the character was only shown in flashbacks in the comic books, Min was not part of the early publicity for the series in order to keep his role a secret. Min also used the expanded role in the television show to develop the character "from the ground up", and worked closely with Ethan Hwang, who played a young Ben, to ensure a "similar essence".

The Umbrella Academy was renewed for a second season in April 2019, with Min being upgraded to the main cast. That same month, it was announced that Min had been cast in a main role in the science fiction film After Yang, starring Colin Farrell. The film was expected to be released in 2020 but was delayed to 2021 due to the COVID-19 pandemic in the United States.

Filmography

Film

Television

References

External links

Living people
21st-century American male actors
American male actors of Korean descent
Cornell University alumni
American male film actors
American male television actors
1990 births